The Igo Masters Cup was a Japanese Go competition. It was held nine times from 2011 until 2019, when it was discontinued. The tournament sponsor was Fumakilla, a chemical manufacturing company.

Outline
The tournament was open only to players over the age of 50 and who have won at least one Top 7 title (Kisei, Meijin, Honinbo, Tengen, Oza, Judan, Gosei). The format was single knockout and each player was allotted two hours thinking time. The winners' purse was 5 million Yen ($62,000), while the runner-up received 1.5 million yen.

Past winners and runners-up

References

External links
Nihon Ki-in archive (in Japanese)

Igo Masters Cup